South Cariboo Regional Airport or 108 Mile Ranch Airport  is a registered aerodrome located  northwest of 108 Mile Ranch, British Columbia, Canada.

The airport is the regional aerodrome for the South Cariboo Regional District, handling over 2,000 movements a year. It provides facilities for commercial passenger service, MEDEVAC, flight training and corporate traffic.

Facilities and aircraft
South Cariboo Regional Airport contains one asphalt paved runway:

Runway 15/33 measuring 

In 2011, the airport had a total of 963 plane arrivals and departures; 72 of these were medevacs.

The airport is located within walking distance of two resorts and an 18-hole PGA golf course.

Events
Each year, the airport hosts Airport Day. This event was created for locals to enjoy aviation activities and learn more about the aviation industry and, in particular, the airport as a valuable south Cariboo asset.

References

External links
South Cariboo Regional Airport at Cariboo Regional District website
108 Mile Ranch Airport at 108 Mile Ranch Community Association website

Registered aerodromes in British Columbia
Cariboo Regional District